The 2015 Mayo Senior Football Championship was the 114th edition of the Mayo GAA's premier club Gaelic football tournament for senior graded teams in County Mayo, Ireland. The tournament consists of 16 teams, with the winner going on to represent Mayo in the Connacht Senior Club Football Championship. The championship starts with a group stage and then progresses to a knock out stage.

Ballintubber were the defending champions after they defeated Castlebar Mitchels in the previous years final, however they lost their crown at the Semi-Final stage, being defeated by Breaffy.

This was Ballyhaunis' first return to the senior grade in over 20 years after claiming the Mayo Intermediate Football Championship title, 26 years after they won their last Intermediate crown in 1988.

On 26 October 2015, Castlebar Mitchels claimed their 29th S.F.C. title when defeating Breaffy 4-10 to 0-9 in McHale Park.

Shrule-Glencorrib were relegated to the Intermediate ranks for 2016 after 12 years as a senior club.

Team Changes
The following teams have changed division since the 2014 championship season.

To S.F.C.
Promoted from I.F.C.
 Ballyhaunis -  (Intermediate Champions)

From S.F.C.
Relegated to I.F.C.
 Westport

Group stage
All 16 teams enter the competition at this stage. The top 2 teams in each group go into the Quarter-Finals while the bottom team of each group will enter a Relegation Playoff. For all group matches the home team is named first.

Group A

Round 1:
 Davitts 1-9, 1-10 Breaffy, 24/5/2015,
 Knockmore 0-15, 1-9 Ballyhaunis, 24/5/2015,

Round 2:
 Davitts 0-9, 1-14 Knockmore, 20/6/2015,
 Breaffy 5-12, 0-11 Ballyhaunis, 21/6/2015,

Round 3:
 Knockmore 1-7, 3-9 Breaffy, 28/6/2015,
 Ballyhaunis 0-12, 1-9 Davitts, 28/6/2015,

Group B

Round 1
 Ballina Stephenites 1-11, 0-7 Claremorris, 23/5/2015,
 Castlebar Mitchels 0-10, 0-6 Ballaghaderreen, 23/5/2015,

Round 2
 Castlebar Mitchels 1-12, 1-6 Ballina Stephenites, 20/6/2015,
 Ballaghaderreen 1-10, 0-9 Claremorris, 21/6/2015,

Round 3
 Ballina Stephenites 0-10, 0-8 Ballaghaderreen, 27/6/2015,
 Claremorris 0-9, 2-16 Castlebar Mitchels, 27/6/2015,

Group C

Round 1
 Ballintubber 1-23, 1-8 Ballinrobe, 24/5/2015,
 Aghamore 0-7, 0-8 Crossmolina Deel Rovers, 30/5/2015,

Round 2
 Ballinrobe 3-9, 2-11 Crossmolina Deel Rovers, 20/6/2015,
 Aghamore 0-10, 2-8 Ballintubber, 21/6/2015,

Round 3
 Ballintubber 2-11, 0-7 Crossmolina Deel Rovers, 27/6/2015,
 Ballinrobe 1-8, 1-15 Aghamore, 27/6/2015,

Group D

Round 1
 Kiltane 1-16, 1-14 Shrule-Glencorrib, 24/5/2015,
 Garrymore 2-12, 1-11 Charlestown Sarsfields, 24/5/2015,

Round 2
 Kiltane 1-10, 1-9 Garrymore, 20/6/2015,
 Shrule-Glencorrib 1-8, 2-14 Charlestown Sarsfields, 21/6/2015,

Round 3
 Garrymore 3-17, 0-8 Shrule-Glencorrib, 28/6/2015,
 Charlestown Sarsfields 0-12, 1-9 Kiltane, 28/6/2015,

Knock-Out Stages

Relegation Playoffs
Relegation Semi-Finals:
 Claremorris 1-16, 0-12 Ballinrobe, Hollymount, 26/9/2015,
 Ballyhaunis 0-11, 0-10 Shrule/Glencorrib, Claremorris, 27/9/2015,

Relegation Final:
 Ballinrobe 5-6, 2-4 Shrule/Glencorrib, Hollymount, 4/10/2015,

Finals
The top 8 teams from the league stages qualify for a random unseeded draw for the Quarter-Finals.

{{8TeamBracket-Compact-NoSeeds-Byes
| RD1=Quarter-Finals
| RD2=Semi-Finals
| RD3=Final
|group1=
|group2=
| score-width= 35
| RD1-team01= Breaffy
| RD1-score01= 2-12
| RD1-team02= Garrymore
| RD1-score02= 0-14
| RD1-team03= Ballintubber
| RD1-score03= ''0-16| RD1-team04= Ballina Stephenites
| RD1-score04= 0-7
| RD1-team05= Knockmore| RD1-score05= 5-21| RD1-team06= Kiltane
| RD1-score06= 3-7
| RD1-team07= Castlebar Mitchels| RD1-score07= 5-13| RD1-team08= Aghamore
| RD1-score08= 1-7
| RD2-team01= Breaffy| RD2-score01= 4-7| RD2-team02= Ballintubber
| RD2-score02= 1-12
| RD2-team03= Knockmore
| RD2-score03= 2-12
| RD2-team04=  Castlebar Mitchels| RD2-score04= 4-15| RD3-team01= Breaffy
| RD3-score01= 0-9
| RD3-team02=  Castlebar Mitchels| RD3-score02= 4-10}}Quarter-Finals: 
 Knockmore 5-21, 3-7 Kiltane, James Stephens Park, 3/10/2015,
 Breaffy 2-12, 0-14 Garrymore, McHale Park, 26/9/2015,
 Castlebar Mitchels 5-13, 1-7 Aghamore, McHale Park, 26/9/2015,
 Ballintubber 0-16, 0-7 Ballina Stephenites, Pearse Park, 27/9/2015,Semi-Finals: Breaffy 4-7, 1-12 Ballintubber, McHale Park, 11/10/2015,
 Castlebar Mitchels 4-15, 2-12 Knockmore, McHale Park, 11/10/2015,Final: Castlebar Mitchels 4-10''', 0-9 Breaffy, McHale Park, 26/10/2015,

Championship statistics

Miscellaneous

 Ballyhaunis return to the senior grade for the first time since 1995.

Connacht Senior Club Football Championship

References

External links

Mayo Senior Football Championship
Mayo Senior Football Championship
Mayo GAA club championships